This is a list of elected members of the Australian Capital Territory Advisory Council from its creation in 1930 until its replacement by the Australian Capital Territory House of Assembly in 1974.

First Council, May 1930 – May 1931

Second Council, May 1931 – September 1935

1 Frederick Gell (Independent) resigned in August 1933. H. C. Green (Independent) was appointed as his replacement in September 1933.

Third Council, September 1935 – September 1937

Fourth Council, September 1937 – September 1939

1 Thomas Shakespeare (Independent) died in September 1938. John Muir (Labor) was appointed to replace him.

Fifth Council, September 1939 – September 1941

Sixth Council, September 1941 – September 1943

Seventh Council, September 1943 – September 1945

Eighth Council, September 1945 – September 1947

Ninth Council, September 1947 – September 1949

Tenth Council, September 1949 – September 1951

1 Lewis Nott (Independent) resigned in December 1949 to run for the House of Representatives at the federal election. Arthur Shakespeare (Independent) was appointed as his replacement.
2 Jim Fraser (Labor) resigned in May 1951 to run for the House of Representatives at the federal election. Oliver Bourke (Labor) was appointed as his replacement.
3 Ulrich Ellis (Independent) resigned in June 1951. Lewis Nott (Independent), who had been defeated by Fraser for his federal seat, was appointed as his replacement.

Eleventh Council, September 1951 – September 1953

1 The Council was expanded in September 1952. R. G. Bailey (Independent) and Oliver Bourke (Labor) were appointed to fill the two new seats.

Twelfth Council, September 1953 – September 1955

Thirteenth Council, September 1955 – September 1957

Fourteenth Council, September 1957 – September 1959

1 Day resigned from the Liberal Party in 1957 and was re-elected as an Independent.

Fifteenth Council, September 1959 – September 1961

1 William McIntyre Campbell (Independent) resigned in July 1960. Bill Pye (Independent) was appointed as his replacement.
2 Heinz Arndt (Labor) resigned in September 1960. Herbert Blair (Labor) was appointed as his replacement.

Sixteenth Council, September 1961 – September 1964

1 Bert Blair (Labor) died in November 1963. Bill Spellman (Labor) was appointed as his replacement in December.

Seventeenth Council, September 1964 – September 1967

Eighteenth Council, September 1967 – September 1970

1 Lyndall Ryan (Labor) resigned in December 1968. Fred McCauley (Labor) was appointed as her replacement.

2 By 1967 the Australian Capital Territory Progress and Welfare Council had dissolved, and Pead thereafter stood as an Independent candidate.

Nineteenth Council, September 1970 – September 1974

References

Elected Members of the ACT Advisory Council

Members of Australian Capital Territory parliaments by term
20th-century Australian politicians